Sadovnichy (from садовник meaning gardener) is a Russian masculine surname. The feminine counterpart is Sadovnichaya. It may refer to:
Ivan Sadownichy (born 1987), Belarusian football player
Viktor Sadovnichiy (born 1939), Russian mathematician

Russian-language surnames